Ireland originally planned to participate in the Eurovision Song Contest 2020 with the song "Story of My Life", performed by Lesley Roy and written by herself, Catt Gravitt, Robert Marvin, and Tom Shapiro. The song and the singer were internally selected on 5 March 2020 by the Irish broadcaster  (RTÉ) to represent the nation at the 2020 contest in Rotterdam, the Netherlands. However, due to the COVID-19 pandemic in Europe, the contest was cancelled.

Ireland was drawn to compete in the first half of the first semi-final of the Eurovision Song Contest, which would've taken place on 12 May 2020.

Background

Ireland has won the contest a record seven times in total, the most out of any nation. The country's first win came in 1970, with then-18-year-old Dana winning with "All Kinds of Everything". Ireland holds the record for being the only country to win the contest three times in a row (in 1992, 1993 and 1994), as well as having the only three-time winner (Johnny Logan, who won in 1980 as a singer, 1987 as a singer-songwriter, and again in 1992 as a songwriter). In 2011 and 2012, Jedward represented the nation for two consecutive years, managing to qualify to the final both times and achieve Ireland's highest position in the contest since 2000, placing eighth in 2011 with the song "Lipstick". However, in 2013, despite managing to qualify to the final, Ryan Dolan and his song "Only Love Survives" placed last in the final. The Irish entries from 2014 to 2017 all failed to qualify for the final. Ireland once again qualified for the final in 2018 with the song Together performed by Ryan O'Shaughnessy, placing 16th in the grand final. However, in 2019, Ireland once again failed to qualify for the final, placing last in the second semi-final with Sarah McTernan and the song "22".

Before Eurovision

Internal selection
RTÉ confirmed their intentions to participate at the 2020 Eurovision Song Contest on 16 September 2019. On 26 September 2019, the broadcaster opened a submission period where artists and composers "with a proven track record of success in the music industry" were able to submit their entries until 25 October 2019. In addition to the public submissions, RTÉ reserved the right to approach established artists and composers to submit entries and to match songs with different artists to the ones who submitted an entry.

On 5 March 2020, RTÉ announced during the RTÉ 2FM programme Breakfast with Doireann and Eoghan that they had internally selected Lesley Roy to represent Ireland in Rotterdam. Along with the announcement that Roy would represent Ireland on 5 March, the song to be performed by Roy, "Story of My Life", shortlisted and selected by a jury panel with members appointed by RTÉ and RTÉ 2FM, was released and uploaded on YouTube. The song was written by Roy, Catt Gravitt, Robert Marvin, and Tom Shapiro. Roy's first live performance of the song took place on 6 March, during The Late Late Show.

At Eurovision
According to Eurovision rules, all nations with the exceptions of the host country and the "Big Five" (France, Germany, Italy, Spain and the United Kingdom) are required to qualify from one of two semi-finals in order to compete for the final; the top ten countries from each semi-final progress to the final. The European Broadcasting Union (EBU) split up the competing countries into six different pots based on voting patterns from previous contests, with countries with favourable voting histories put into the same pot. On 28 January 2020, a special allocation draw was held which placed each country into one of the two semi-finals, as well as which half of the show they would perform in. Ireland was placed into the first semi-final, to be held on 12 May 2020, and was scheduled to perform in the first half of the show. However, due to 2019-20 pandemic of Coronavirus, the contest was cancelled.

In the Eurovision Song Celebration YouTube broadcast in place of the heats, it was revealed that the song would have performed 7th, between Lithuania and Russia.

References 

2020
Countries in the Eurovision Song Contest 2020
Eurovision
Eurovision